Pavlidou is a surname. Notable people with the surname include:

 Ekaterini Pavlidou (born 1993), Greek chess player
 Maria Pavlidou (born 1978), Greek tennis player
 Vasiliki Pavlidou, Greek astrophysicist

Greek-language surnames